This is a list of notable employee-owned companies by country. These are companies totally or significantly owned (directly or indirectly) by their employees.

Employee ownership takes different forms and one form may predominate in a particular country. For example, in the U.S. most of the estimated 4,000 majority employee-owned companies have an Employee Stock Ownership Plan (ESOP). An ESOP is an employee-owner method that provides a company's workforce with an ownership interest in the company. In an ESOP, companies provide their employees with stock ownership, often at no up-front cost to the employees. ESOP shares, however, are part of employees' remuneration for work performed. Shares are allocated to employees and may be held in an ESOP trust until the employee retires or leaves the company. The shares are then sold.

Canada 
 EllisDon
 Friesens
 Golder Associates
 Hatch Ltd
 Morrison Hershfield
 PCL Construction

India 
 Aavin
 Adarsh Co-operative Bank
 Amul
 Banas Dairy
 Co-optex
 Dabbawala
 Horticultural Producers' Cooperative Marketing and Processing Society
 Indian Coffee House
 Indian Farmers Fertiliser Cooperative
 Indian Potash Limited
 J Thomas & Co. Pvt. Ltd.
 Kaira District Co-operative Milk Producers' Union
 Karnataka Milk Federation
 Kerala Co-operative Milk Marketing Federation
 Krishak Bharati Cooperative
 Larsen & Toubro
 Mother Dairy
 National Agricultural Cooperative Marketing Federation of India
 Orissa State Cooperative Milk Producers' Federation
 Pratibha Mahila Sahakari Bank
 Rehwa Society
 Sant Muktabai Sahakari Sakhar Karkhana
 The Totgars' Cooperative Sale Society Limited
 Working Women's Forum

Japan 
 Nikkei, Inc.

Scandinavia 
 Kantega

Spain 
 IDOM
 Mondragon Corporation

United Kingdom 
 Aardman Animations
 Agilisys
 Allford Hall Monaghan & Morris
 Arup
 Boydell & Brewer
 Central Surrey Health
 Donald Insall Associates
 Hayes Davidson
 John Lewis Partnership
 MJP Architects
 Mott MacDonald
 PA Consulting Group
 Richer Sounds
 Riverford
 Talis Group
 Team Consulting
 Tullis Russell
 West Highland Free Press
 Go Ape

United States

 Acadian Ambulance
 Applied Research Associates
 Arizmendi Bakery
 Bi-Mart
 Black & Veatch
 Bob's Red Mill
 Brookshire Brothers
 Carter's Foods
 Casino Queen
 CDM Smith
 Certain Affinity
 CH2M Hill
 The Cheese Board Collective
 Chicago and North Western Railway - sold to Union Pacific Railroad in 1995
 Columbia Forest Products
 Dahl's Foods
 Davey Tree Expert Company
 Dynetics
 Ebby Halliday Realtors
 Edgewood Management, LLC
 Eureka Casino Resort
 Evergreen Cooperatives
 Ferrellgas Partners
 Food Giant
 Frontline Test Equipment
 Gardener's Supply Company
 Gensler
 Golden Artist Colors
 Graybar
 Great Lakes Brewing Company
 Greatland Corporation
 Harps Food Stores
 HDR, Inc.
 Hensel Phelps Construction
 Herff Jones
 Herman Miller
 Houchens Industries
 Huck's Food & Fuel
 Hy-Vee
 John J. McMullen & Associates - now part of Alion Science and Technology
 Journal Communications
 Kimley-Horn and Associates, Inc.
 King Arthur Flour
 Lampin Corporation
 Landmark Education
 Lifetouch
 Mast General Store
 Mathematica Policy Research
 Mercedes Homes
 Mushkin
 MWH Global
 New Belgium Brewing Company
 Neuberger Berman
 Niemann Foods
 Oliver Winery
 Peter Kiewit Sons'
 Phelps County Bank
 Publix
 Raycom Media
 Recology
 Robert McNeel & Associates
 Rosendin Electric
 Scheels
 Schreiber Foods
 Schweitzer Engineering Laboratories
 Springfield ReManufacturing
 Southern Exposure Seed Exchange
 Stewart's Shops
 Stiefel Labs
 STV Group
 Swales Aerospace
 Taylor Guitars
 Tidyman's
 Torch Technologies
 W. L. Gore & Associates
 W. W. Norton & Company
 Westat
 Wimberly Allison Tong & Goo
 WinCo Foods
 Woodman's Food Market

See also

 List of co-operative federations
 List of cooperatives
 List of energy cooperatives
 List of food cooperatives
 List of retailers' cooperatives
 List of utility cooperatives
 List of worker cooperatives
 Lists of companies – company-related list articles on Wikipedia

References

External links 
 The NCEO's Employee Ownership 100 (United States)
 The ESOP Association (United States)
 ESOPB2B.com ESOP Registry (United States)

 
Lists of companies
Lists of cooperatives